Valentin Lazarov was a basketball referee and expert, who was enshrined as a technical official in the FIBA Hall of Fame on 19 June 2013.

In addition to his basketball career, Lazarov was also a civil engineer with more than 65 years of experience with projects all over the world. He worked as the General Director of the Design Institute of the International Academy of Architecture.

Lazarov was born on 5 October 1931 in Sofia, the capital of Bulgaria, where he lived with his family. He has two daughters and two grandchildren. Valentin Lazarov was an Honorary Citizen of Sofia because of his contributions as a civil engineer. He died on 28 December 2020, aged 89.

Basketball career 
Lazarov was enshrined as a technical official in the FIBA Hall of Fame on 19 June 2013.

Highlights 
 Basketball referee from 1950
 FIBA referee (1958–1983)
 Officiated more than 440 international games and finals: FIBA World Championships and European Championships, African Championships, Asian Championships, Korac Cups, Ronchetti Cups, Final Fours, etc.
 Since 1980: FIBA International Instructor, conducted 336 FIBA and other International Clinics for referees, commissioners and instructors in 116 countries
 FIBA Commissioner (1983–2007)
 Member of FIBA Technical Commission since 1976
 Vice-President Technical Commission FIBA Europe (1996–2004)
 Official FIBA Interpreter of the Rules (1992–2005)
 10 Olympic Games participations
 Author of 2 books on Basketball officiating and more than 20 articles in various sport magazines, Manuals for Commissioners, Manuals for National instructors, etc.
 As a player: basketball team of French College (1946–1949)
 Graduated from 2-year school for talented players (1950–52)
 Captain of the basketball team of the Technical University in Sofia (1949–1954)

Distinctions and Recognitions 
 Honorary National Referee in Bulgaria (1958)
 FIBA/FFBA CUP for "BEST REFEREE IN EUROPE" (1962)
 Honorary FIBA referee (1976)
 Golden Whistle as best referee in Bulgaria
 FIBA Cup - "Radomir Shaper" (2000)
 FIBA Basketball Oscar (2002)
 Honorary President of the Bulgarian Referees’ Association (2005)
 FIBA Africa "Äbd-El-Azem Ashry" Cup (2006)
 Honorary Citizen of Sofia
 6 highest Bulgarian professional awards for his projects/medals

Civil engineering career 
For decades, Lazarov was a General Director of Interproject and a Director at the International Academy of Architecture. During his long career, he was responsible for the construction, design, and overall civil plan for embassies, sports facilities and living quarters around the world.

Highlights

Projects 
 Ministry of Foreign Affairs - Sofia
 Bistrica government residency with covered swimming pool
 Bulgarian Sports Federation building with covered swimming pool
 Belite Brezi residential complex  
 38 residential buildings in Sofia
 Buzludja memorial
 Bulgarian embassy in Kabul, Afghanistan
 Bulgarian embassy in Havanna, Cuba
 Samokov movie theatre 
 Rudartsi swimming pool
 Pernik's culture home
 Dimitrovgrad's culture home
 Plovdiv's library
 Koprivshtitsa - 30 houses in the renowned "Bulgarian old style"

Municipality of Damascus 1964 - 1970 

Construction and design of numerous sports facilities in the capital of Syria that include:

 Baramke sports complex with halls and football stadium 
 Mezze sports complex with covered swimming pool and football field
 Ashrafie sports complex with football field and hotel 
 Bulgarian exhibition palace (rewarded with medal)

References

Bulgarian sportspeople
1931 births
2020 deaths
FIBA referees
Sportspeople from Sofia